Neopetrosia is a genus of marine petrosiid sponges. It was first established by the American spongiologist Max Walker de Laubenfels in 1932. It contains these 27 species:
Neopetrosia carbonaria (Lamarck, 1814)
Neopetrosia chaliniformis (Thiele, 1899)
Neopetrosia compacta (Ridley & Dendy, 1886)
Neopetrosia contignata (Thiele, 1899)
Neopetrosia cristata Vicente, Ríos, Zea & Toonen, 2019
Neopetrosia cylindrica (Lamarck, 1815)
Neopetrosia delicatula (Dendy, 1905)
Neopetrosia dendrocrevacea Vicente, Ríos, Zea & Toonen, 2019
Neopetrosia densissima (Wilson, 1904)
Neopetrosia dominicana (Pulitzer-Finali, 1986)
Neopetrosia dutchi Van Soest, Meesters & Becking, 2014
Neopetrosia eurystomata Van Soest, Meesters & Becking, 2014
Neopetrosia granulosa (Wilson, 1925)
Neopetrosia halichondrioides Dendy, 1905
Neopetrosia massa (Ridley & Dendy, 1886)
Neopetrosia ovata Van Soest, Meesters & Becking, 2014
Neopetrosia perforata (Lévi, 1959)
Neopetrosia problematica (de Laubenfels, 1930)
Neopetrosia proxima (Duchassaing & Michelotti, 1864)
Neopetrosia rava (Thiele, 1899)
Neopetrosia retiderma (Dendy, 1922)
Neopetrosia rosariensis (Zea & Rützler, 1983)
Neopetrosia sapra (de Laubenfels, 1954)
Neopetrosia seriata (Hentschel, 1912)
Neopetrosia sigmafera Vicente, Ríos, Zea & Toonen, 2019
Neopetrosia similis (Ridley & Dendy, 1886)
Neopetrosia subtriangularis (Duchassaing, 1850)
Neopetrosia sulcata Santos, Sandes, Cabral & Pinheiro, 2016
Neopetrosia tenera (Carter, 1887)
Neopetrosia truncata (Ridley & Dendy, 1886)
Neopetrosia tuberosa (Dendy, 1922)
Neopetrosia vanilla (de Laubenfels, 1930)
Neopetrosia zumi (Ristau, 1978)

References

Petrosina